Antoine Baudeau, sieur de Somaize (born c. 1630) was a secretary to Marie Mancini, niece of Cardinal Mazarin. He published a Grand Dictionnaire des Prétieuses, ou La Clef de la Langue des Ruelles in 1660; a much enlarged edition was published in 1661. The same year he published a comedy, Le Procez des prétieuses, en vers burlesques.

See also
Hôtel de Rambouillet

Notes

Further reading
 Duchêne, Roger Les précieuses, ou, Comment l'esprit vint aux femmes

External links
 
Selected entries from Le Grand Dictionnaire des Précieuses (French) (Bibliographical details.)

1630s births
1680s deaths
17th-century French male writers
17th-century French dramatists and playwrights